Jamsil Stadium may refer to a few stadiums in South Korea:

 Jamsil Arena, Jamsil-dong
 Jamsil Baseball Stadium, Jamsil-dong
 Jamsil Olympic Stadium, Seoul

See also
 Jamsil (disambiguation)